Rodney Hylton Smith, better known by his stage name Roots Manuva (born 9 September 1972), is a British rapper and producer. Since his debut in 1994, he has produced numerous albums and singles on the label Big Dada, achieving commercial success with albums Run Come Save Me and Slime & Reason. He has been described as "one of the most influential artists in British music history." His most recent studio album, Bleeds, was released in October 2015.

Biography
Smith grew up around Stockwell, London, England. His parents were from a small village in Jamaica where his father was a preacher and tailor. He spent much of his early life in poverty and this and his strict Pentecostal upbringing had an influence on his music as can be heard in many of his tracks such as "Sinny Sin Sins" and "Colossal Insight".

Of his early discovery of music he says:

Smith made his recorded debut in 1994 as part of IQ Procedure through Suburban Base's short-lived hip hop imprint Bluntly Speaking Vinyl. He debuted as Roots Manuva the same year on Blak Twang's "Queen's Head" single, before releasing his own single, "Next Type of Motion" the following year through the same label, the Sound of Money. 1996 saw the release of his collaborations with Skitz ("Where My Mind Is At"/"Blessed Be The Manner") on 23 Skidoo's Ronin label. The release of "Feva" on Tony Vegas' Wayward imprint followed in 1997. This was also the year that saw the first releases from Big Dada, a collaboration between Coldcut's Ninja Tune label and hip hop journalist Will Ashon.

Releasing for Coldcut's renowned experimental/hip hop label Ninja Tune in 1998, some of his music may be seen as a predecessor of grime. The following year he released his debut album, Brand New Second Hand. A reference to his family's modest lifestyle, the title is a phrase his mother used for presents he got as a youngster that were pre-used. The single "Witness (1 Hope)", from his second album Run Come Save Me, with its lyrical flow and heavy shuffling squelch bass (allegedly a result of Smith trying to copy the Doctor Who theme) is a UK rap anthem. He had such an impact on the UK rap scene that The Times said that "his is the voice of urban Britain, encompassing dub, ragga, funk and hip hop as it sweeps from crumbling street corners to ganja-filled dancehalls, setting gritty narratives against all manner of warped beats." Manuva was rewarded for his breakthrough with a MOBO as Best Hip Hop Act that year.

The lyrics of his songs have a British edge, with critics highlighting his references to eating cheese on toast and drinking bitter as examples of this.
 
He can be heard on many songs performed with other artists such as Chali 2na (and Ozomatli), Jamie Cullum, DJ Shadow, Mr Scruff, U.N.K.L.E., Fun Lovin' Criminals, Nightmares on Wax, The Cinematic Orchestra, Beth Orton, The Herbaliser, Leftfield, Saian Supa Crew and Coldcut. He also made an appearance on the Gorillaz album Demon Days, on the track "All Alone".

Manuva headlined the Lounge on the Farm festival 11 July 2009.

Discography

Studio albums

EPs
Next Type of Motion (1995)
Awfully De/EP (24 October 2005)
Banana Skank EP (21 January 2013)
 "Stolen Youth EP" (6 August 2013)

Live albums 
 Live from London (iTunes) (15 August 2008)

Singles
 "Juggle Tings Proper" (22 February 1999)
 "Motion 5000" (5 July 1999)
 "Witness (1 Hope)" (23 July 2001) UK No. 45
 "Dreamy Days" (8 October 2001) UK No. 53
 "Yellow Submarine" (14 October 2002)
 "Colossal Insight" (17 January 2005) UK No. 33
 "Too Cold" (21 March 2005) UK No. 39
 "Buff Nuff" (30 June 2008)
 "Again & Again" (25 August 2008) – featured on the EA TRAX soundtrack for the EA Sports videogame Fight Night Round 4
 "Let the Spirit" (27 October 2008)
 "Do Nah Bodda Mi" (29 June 2009)
 "It's On (Banana Klan)" (28 April 2011)
 "Here We Go Again (feat. Spikey Tee)" (3 October 2011)
 "Don't Breathe Out" (22 September 2015)

Guest appearances
 Amon Tobin – "Saboteur mix," also known as "Saboteur -- Roots Manuva version" (from Ninja Tune compilation Xen Cuts)
 Antipop Consortium - "NY to Tokyo" (from Fluorescent Black)
 Audio Bullys – "Made Like That" (feat. Roots Manuva & Mr Fox) (from Generation)
 Blak Twang – "Queen's Head" (from Dettwork S.E. promo); "Shhhoosh" (from 19 Long Time)
 Breakage – "Run 'Em Out"
 The Cinematic Orchestra – "All Things to All Men" (from Every Day); "A Caged Bird / Imitations of Life" (from To Believe)
 Cornish Waters – "Look to Myself for Faith" (from UK Hustlerz – The Return, under the pseudonym Brigadier Smythe)
 Coldcut – "True Skool" (from Sound Mirrors) UK No. 61, "Only Heaven" (from Only Heaven EP)
 DJ Mentat – "Rugged Wid' It" (with Seanie T)
 DJ Shadow – "GDMFSOB (UNKLE Uncensored mix)" (from "Mashin' on the Motorway")
 DJ Skitz – "Inner City Folk" and "Fingerprints of the Gods" (from Countryman)
 Dobie – "Connectivity" (from The Sound of One Hand Clapping)
 Freq Nasty – "Boomba Clatt" (from Bring Me the Head of Freq Nasty)
 Fun Lovin' Criminals – "Keep on Yellin'" (from Classic Fantastic)
 Gorillaz – "All Alone" (from Demon Days alongside Martina Topley-Bird)
 The Herbaliser – "Lord Lord" (from Take London); "Starlight" (from Very Mercenary)
 INORAN – "Rat Race" (from Sou)
 Jamie Cullum – "Love for $ale" (from "Momentum")
 King Kooba – "Barefoot" (from Indian Summer)
 Killa Kela – "Here Comes The Submarines feat. Roots Manuva" (from Elocution)
 Leftfield – "Dusted" (from Rhythm and Stealth) UK No. 28
 Lotek HiFi – "Move Ya Ting" (from Mixed Blessings)
 The Maccabees – "Empty Vessels"
 Massive Attack - "Dead Editors" (from Ritual Spirit EP)
 Morcheeba – "Blaze Away" (from Blaze Away)
 Mr. Scruff – "Jus Jus" (from Keep It Unreal), "Nice Up The Function" (from Ninja Tuna)
 N'fa – "My Style" (from Cause An Effect)
 New Flesh for Old – "Norbert & Cecil" (from Understanding, under the pseudonym Cecil P.Y.L.M. Pim Pimpernel)
 Reachout – "For Whom the Heart Beats" (from The Bristo Sq. EP)
 Ty – "Oh U Want More?" (from Upwards) UK No. 65 (also "So U Want ? (refix)" on Upwards new edition)
 Saian Supa Crew – "Hey Yo My Man"
 Speech Debelle - "Blaze Up a Fire" (from Freedom of Speech)
 Colossus – "Thrupenny Bits" (from "West Oaktown") (OmRecords 2002 – pseudonym Hylton Smythe)
 Nightmares on Wax – "70s 80s (Up Bringing Mix) (feat. Roots Manuva, LSK, Rodney P and Tozz 180)" (from "70s 80s" single)
 The Herbaliser – "Something Wicked (Roots Manuva's Haunted House Dub)" (limited free release from Ninja Tune website to celebrate forthcoming Ninja Tune boxset).
 DELS – "Capsize" (from GOB – 2011)

Other
 Badmeaningood Vol.2 (7 October 2002) (19 tracks selected by Rodney Smith for the Badmeaningood series.)
 Back to Mine: Roots Manuva (24 October 2005) (18 tracks selected by Smith for the Back to Mine series.)
 The Blacknificent 7 – Riding Thru Da Undaground! (collaboration with Seanie T, Rodney P, Skeme, Est'elle, Karl Hinds, Jeff3)
 Black Whole Styles – "Uranium 235" (with Drunken Imoortals & New Flesh) & "Feel Da Panic"
 Extra Yard: The Bouncement Revolution – "Dreamy Days(Loteck Productions) featuring Ricky Rankin, "Born Again" featuring Wildflower, "Witness The Swords" featuring Fallacy, Rodney P, Blackitude, Big P & Skeme, "Bashment Boogie"
 Sound01: A Big Dada Sampler – "Skiver's Guide" featuring Black Twang & Gamma

Trivia
 "Witness (1 Hope)" appeared in the 8th episode of season 2 of Ted Lasso, as psychologist Sharon was biking to her office.
 "Witness (1 Hope)" was played in the UK game show Total Wipeout international special episode.
 "Witness" (1 Hope) was also featured in the 2006 film Children of Men.
 "Awfully Deep" was used as a background track in series 2 of TFI Friday''.
 "Witness (1 Hope)" was used as part of the soundtrack for Big Up Production's video of Chris Sharma's ascent of the bouldering problem called "Witness the Fitness" (V15).

References

External links

Roots Manuva interview at musicOMH.com

1972 births
Living people
English people of Jamaican descent
English male rappers
English Pentecostals
Big Dada artists
Ninja Tune artists
Rappers from London
People from Stockwell
Black British male rappers